The coat of arms of Cameroon consists of a shield with a banner above and below it. Behind the shield are two crossed fasces. The shield has the same color pattern as the flag of Cameroon, and in the center is a map of the nation. The scales of justice are superimposed on top of the map of the nation since 1998.

Description
The constitution of Cameroon describes the coat of arms as follows:

The coat of arms of the Republic of Cameroon shall be an escutcheon surmounted chief by the legend <<Republic of Cameroon>> and supported by two crossed fasces with the motto <<Peace-Work-Fatherland>> base.

The escutcheon shall be composed of a star on a field [vert] and triangle gules, charged with the geographical outline of Cameroon azure, and surcharged with the sword and scales of justice sable.

The previous version of the state arms had text in French  only, with "République du Cameroun – 1er Janvier 1960" on a scroll above the shield, and "Paix, Travail, Patrie" below the shield.  The shield differed in that the green and yellow areas to left and right each had one large blue five-pointed star, while the central red area did not have a star on top (so that the blue map outline of Cameroon extended higher).

Earlier coats of arms

Proposed arms 1914
In 1914, the German government decided to assign coats of arms to its overseas colonies, including Cameroon.  Arms were designed, but World War I broke out before the project was  finalised, and the arms were never actually taken into use. Giving the colonies their own insignia in time of war could let them have a symbol to rally around in case of rebellion. The arms proposed for the Imperial Colony of Cameroon depicted an elephant's head and the German imperial eagle on a chief. The eagle and the imperial crown on the shield was the same for all the proposed colonial arms.

Other coats of arms

See also
Flag of Cameroon
Coats of arms of German colonies

References

External links

National symbols of Cameroon
Cameroon
Cameroon
Coats of arms with weighing scales
Cameroon
Cameroon